The following people have been vice-chancellors of the University of Auckland in New Zealand: 

 1958–1970 – Kenneth John Maidment (first vice-chancellor, previously principal 1949–1957)
 1971 – Sir Colin Maiden
 1995 – Kit Carson
 1998 – John Hood
 2005 – Stuart McCutcheon
 2020 – Dawn Freshwater

See also 
 List of chancellors of the University of Oxford

References 

 
Auckland